Hammar is a Swedish surname.

Clarence Hammar
Fredrik Hammar
Johan Hammar
Molly Hammar

Swedish-language surnames